Maman(s) is a 2015 French short drama film written and directed by Maïmouna Doucouré. The film stars Sokhna Diallo, Eriq Ebouaney and Maïmouna Gueye in the lead roles. The film's plot centers on Aida, an eight-year-old girl, who is adjusting to the introduction of her father's second wife. The film was inspired by director Maïmouna Doucouré's own experiences with polygamy as a young child. The film was premiered at several international film festivals including the 2015 Toronto International Film Festival, 2016 Sundance Film Festival and 2017 César Awards. The film jointly won the César Award for Best Short Film at the 42nd César Awards in February 2017 along with Alice Diop's directorial Towards Tenderness (Vers la tendresse).

Synopsis 
An 8-year-old girl Aïda (Sokhna Diallo) lives in an apartment with her mother Mariam (Maïmouna Gueye) in the Parisian suburb and her whole family is overwhelmed and eagerly awaiting when her father comes back from Senegal. Suddenly her father Alioune (Eriq Ebouaney) gives a stunning shock when he returns to France from Senegal with his second wife Rama (Mareme N'Diaye). The little girl Aïda and her mother are frustrated with the entrance of a woman and Aïda desperately wants to get rid of her.

Cast 

 Sokhna Diallo as Aïda
 Eriq Ebouaney as Alioune
 Maïmouna Gueye as Mariam
 Mareme N'Diaye as Rama
 Azize Diabaté Abdoulaye
 Maïssa Toumoutou as Bébé
 Aïda Diallo as Bintou
 Khemissa Zarouel as Nora

Release and reception 
Maman(s) selected and premiered in over 200 film festivals and also won around 60 awards in several international film festivals praising the screenplay of the film. The film was premiered on 26 August 2015 at the 2015 TIFF Festival and also received the Short Cuts Award for Best Short Film. The film was also screened at the Sundance Film Festival in 2016, and won the Short Film Jury Prize for International Fiction. The jury panel noted the complex nature of polygamy, and the human conflict that arises which is portrayed in the film.

In December 2016, the film was also screened at the Calcutta International Cult Film Festival in India and was nominated as one of the recipients of the Outstanding Achievement Award.

Awards and nominations

References

External links 

 

2015 films
French drama short films
2010s French-language films
Wolof-language films
2015 short films
Films about immigration
2015 drama films
Films directed by Maïmouna Doucouré
2015 multilingual films
French multilingual films
2010s French films